Thane of Cawdor is a title in the Peerage of Scotland.
The current 7th Earl Cawdor, of Clan Campbell of Cawdor, is the 25th Thane of Cawdor.

In William Shakespeare's play Macbeth, this title was given to Macbeth after the previous Thane of Cawdor was captured and executed for treason against King Duncan.
The historical King Macbeth fought a Thane of Cawdor who died in battle, but he did not thereby acquire the title himself.

The 2nd Earl Cawdor wrote a history of the Thanes of Cawdor, published in 1859.
According to the 2nd Earl, the first thane was originally a Celtic chieftain who allied with Anglo-Saxon King of Scots at a time lost to the historical record.

See also
Thane of Calder

References

Peerage of Scotland
William Shakespeare
Macbeth